Kukulcania is a genus of crevice weavers that was first described by Pekka T. Lehtinen in 1967. It is named after Kukulkan, a Mesoamerican serpent deity.

Species
 it contains fifteen species found in the Americas, including the United States, Peru, and Chile:
Kukulcania arizonica (Chamberlin & Ivie, 1935) – USA, Mexico
Kukulcania bajacali Magalhaes & Ramírez, 2019 – Mexico
Kukulcania benita Magalhaes & Ramírez, 2019 – Mexico (San Benito Is., Baja California)
Kukulcania brignolii (Alayón, 1981) – Mexico
Kukulcania chingona Magalhaes & Ramírez, 2019 – Mexico
Kukulcania cochimi Magalhaes & Ramírez, 2019 – Mexico
Kukulcania geophila (Chamberlin & Ivie, 1935) – USA, Mexico
Kukulcania gertschi Magalhaes & Ramírez, 2019 – Mexico
Kukulcania hibernalis (Hentz, 1842) (type) – USA, Mexico, Central America, Caribbean, South America
Kukulcania hurca (Chamberlin & Ivie, 1942) – USA, Mexico
Kukulcania mexicana Magalhaes & Ramírez, 2019 – Mexico
Kukulcania santosi Magalhaes & Ramírez, 2019 – Mexico, El Salvador, Nicaragua, Costa Rica. Probably introduced in Peru, Chile
Kukulcania tequila Magalhaes & Ramírez, 2019 – Mexico
Kukulcania tractans (O. Pickard-Cambridge, 1896) – Mexico
Kukulcania utahana (Chamberlin & Ivie, 1935) – USA, Mexico

References

Araneomorphae genera
Filistatidae
Spiders of North America
Spiders of South America
Taxa named by Pekka T. Lehtinen